Triclistus is a genus of ichneumon wasps in the family Ichneumonidae. There are at least 90 described species in Triclistus.

Species
These 91 species belong to the genus Triclistus:

 Triclistus adustus Townes & Townes, 1959 c g
 Triclistus aethiops (Gravenhorst, 1829) c g
 Triclistus aitkeni (Cameron, 1897) c g
 Triclistus aitkini (Cameron, 1897) g
 Triclistus alaris Benoit, 1954 c g
 Triclistus albicinctus Thomson, 1887 c g
 Triclistus alpinator Aubert, 1969 c g
 Triclistus amazopeikkus g
 Triclistus anareolatus Benoit, 1965 c g
 Triclistus anthophilae Aeschlimann, 1983 c g
 Triclistus areolatus Thomson, 1887 c g
 Triclistus aruwimiensis Benoit, 1954 c g
 Triclistus ashaninka g
 Triclistus bicolor Szépligeti, 1908 c g
 Triclistus brunnipes (Cresson, 1879) c g
 Triclistus castilloai g
 Triclistus cholo g
 Triclistus chosis Townes & Townes, 1959 c g
 Triclistus concitus Tolkanitz, 1994 c g
 Triclistus congener (Holmgren, 1858) c g
 Triclistus congoensis Benoit, 1955 c g
 Triclistus consimilis Benoit, 1965 c g
 Triclistus crassus Townes & Townes, 1959 c g
 Triclistus dauricus Tolkanitz, 1992 c g
 Triclistus dimidiatus Morley, 1913 c g
 Triclistus emarginalus (Say, 1829) c g b
 Triclistus epermeniae Shaw & Aeschlimann, 1994 c g
 Triclistus evexus Townes & Townes, 1959 c g
 Triclistus facialis Thomson, 1887 c g
 Triclistus glabrosus Momoi & Kusigemati, 1970 c g
 Triclistus globulipes (Desvignes, 1856) c g
 Triclistus hostis Seyrig, 1934 c g
 Triclistus inimicus Seyrig, 1934 c g
 Triclistus inti g
 Triclistus japonicus Kusigemati, 1971 c g
 Triclistus kamijoi Momoi & Kusigemati, 1970 c g
 Triclistus kivuensis Benoit, 1965 c g
 Triclistus kotenkoi Tolkanitz, 1992 c g
 Triclistus laevigatus (Ratzeburg, 1844) c g
 Triclistus lativentris Thomson, 1887 c g
 Triclistus lewi Chiu, 1962 c g
 Triclistus longicalcar Thomson, 1887 c g
 Triclistus luteicornis Benoit, 1954 c g
 Triclistus mandibularis Kusigemati, 1985 c g
 Triclistus matsiguenga g
 Triclistus megantoni g
 Triclistus melanocephalus (Cameron, 1886) c g
 Triclistus mellizas Gauld & Sithole, 2002 c g
 Triclistus meridiator Aubert, 1984 c g
 Triclistus mimerastriae Kusigemati, 1971 c g
 Triclistus minutus Carlson, 1966 c g
 Triclistus muqui g
 Triclistus niger (Bridgman, 1883) c
 Triclistus nigrifemoralis Kusigemati, 1971 c g
 Triclistus nigripes Momoi & Kusigemati, 1970 c g
 Triclistus obsoletus Kusigemati, 1984 c g
 Triclistus occidentis Townes & Townes, 1959 c g
 Triclistus pailas Gauld & Sithole, 2002 c g
 Triclistus pallipes Holmgren, 1873 c g b
 Triclistus parallelus Uchida, 1932 c g
 Triclistus parasitus Seyrig, 1934 c g
 Triclistus parvulus Kusigemati, 1980 c g
 Triclistus planus Momoi & Kusigemati, 1970 c g
 Triclistus podagricus (Gravenhorst, 1829) c g b
 Triclistus politifacies Kusigemati, 1987 c g
 Triclistus propinquus (Cresson, 1868) c
 Triclistus proximator Aubert, 1984 c g
 Triclistus pubiventris Thomson, 1887 c
 Triclistus pygmaeus (Cresson, 1864) c g
 Triclistus pyrellae Tolkanitz, 1983 c g
 Triclistus rebellis Seyrig, 1934 c g
 Triclistus rectus Townes & Townes, 1959 c g
 Triclistus rivwus Gauld & Sithole, 2002 c g
 Triclistus rubellus Kusigemati, 1971 c g
 Triclistus semistriatus Kusigemati, 1971 c g
 Triclistus slimellus Gauld & Sithole, 2002 c g
 Triclistus sonani Chiu, 1962 c g
 Triclistus spiracularis Thomson, 1887 c g
 Triclistus squalidus (Holmgren, 1858) c g
 Triclistus tabetus Gauld & Sithole, 2002 c g
 Triclistus talitzkii Tolkanitz, 1983 c g
 Triclistus traditor Seyrig, 1934 c g
 Triclistus transfuga Seyrig, 1934 c g
 Triclistus uchidai Kusigemati, 1971 c g
 Triclistus upembaensis Benoit, 1965 c g
 Triclistus vaxinus Gauld & Sithole, 2002 c g
 Triclistus warmi g
 Triclistus xodius Gauld & Sithole, 2002 c g
 Triclistus xylostellae Barron & Bisdee, 1984 c g
 Triclistus yponomeutae Aeschlimann, 1973 c g
 Triclistus yungas g

Data sources: i = ITIS, c = Catalogue of Life, g = GBIF, b = Bugguide.net

References

Further reading

External links

 

Parasitic wasps